Fusion cuisine is cuisine that combines elements of different culinary traditions that originate from different countries, regions, or cultures. They can occur naturally and become aspects of culturally relevant cuisines, or they can be part of the post-1970s movement for contemporary restaurant innovations.

The term fusion cuisine, added to the Oxford English Dictionary in 2002, is defined as "a style of cookery which blends ingredients and methods of preparation from different countries, regions, or ethnic groups; food cooked in this style."

Categories

Fusion food is created by combining various cooking techniques for different cultures to produce a new type of food. Although it is commonly invented by chefs, fusion cuisine can occur naturally within the different cuisines of a region or sub-region. These can include larger regions, such as East Asian cuisine, European cuisine, and Southwestern American cuisine, as well as more specific and lauded ethnic cuisines such as Chinese cuisine, Japanese cuisine, Korean cuisine, French cuisine, Italian cuisine, and New Mexican cuisine.

Chefs within Asian fusion restaurants combine the various cuisines of different Asian countries, have become popular in many parts of the United States and United Kingdom. Often featured are East Asian, Southeast Asian, and South Asian dishes alongside one another and offering dishes that are inspired combinations of such cuisines. California cuisine is considered a fusion culture, taking inspiration particularly from Italy, France, Mexico, the idea of the European delicatessen, and East Asia, and then creating traditional dishes from these cultures with non-traditional ingredients - such as California pizza. One major example is Oceanic cuisine, which combines the different cuisines of the various island nations. In the United Kingdom, fish and chips can be seen as an early fusion dish due to its marrying of ingredients stemming from Jewish, French, and Belgian cuisines. Filipino cuisine is also sometimes characterized as the "original Asian fusion cuisine", combining native culinary traditions and ingredients with the very different cuisines of Spain, Mexico, China, and the United States, among others, due to its unique colonial history.

In Australia, due to the increasing influx of migrants, fusion cuisine is being reinvented and is becoming increasingly the norm at numerous cafes and restaurants, with Modern Australian Asian-fusion restaurants like Tetsuya's in Sydney ranking highly in The World's 50 Best Restaurants.  Another incarnation of fusion cuisine implements a more eclectic approach, which generally features original dishes that combine varieties of ingredients from various cuisines and regions. Such a restaurant might feature a wide variety of dishes inspired by a combination of various regional cuisines with new ideas. Foods in Malaysia (also Indonesia) are another popular example of fusion cuisine between Malay, Javanese, Chinese and Indian and light influences from Thai, Portuguese, Dutch, and British cuisines.

Types 
Another form of fusion food can be created by utilizing ingredients and flavors from one culture to create a unique twist on a dish from the different cultures. For example, a taco pizza is a type of pizza created using taco ingredients such as cheddar and pepper jack cheese, salsa, refried beans, and other common taco ingredients, fusing both Italian and Mexican cuisines. 

Similar approaches have been used for fusion sushi, such as rolling maki with different types of rice and ingredients such as curry and basmati rice, cheese and salsa with Spanish rice, or spiced ground lamb and capers rolled with Greek-style rice and grape leaves, which resembles inside-out dolmades. Some fusion cuisines have themselves become accepted as a national cuisine, as with Peruvian Nikkei cuisine, which combines Japanese spices and seasonings and Peruvian ingredients like ají with seafood. A quintessential Peruvian Nikkei dish is "maki acevichado" or "ceviche roll", consisting of ceviche with avocado rolled into maki.

Saudi Arabia has been investing in resources to preserve their culture. In Jeddah, different cultures from Africa and Asia have used the combination of Saudi Arabia's spices to create new fusion foods found throughout the region and the country.

History

Fusion cuisine has existed for millennia as a form of cross-cultural exchange, though the term was only defined in the late 1900s. Mixtures of different cultures' cuisines have been adapted since the 16th century. A number of these (though not all) have resulted from colonialism, such as bánh mì originating from French ingredients used in French Indochina, Jamaican patties combining the turnover with spices and peppers from the British Empire's possessions in Asia and Africa, and ramen originating as "shina soba" or "Chinese noodle" from the Empire of Japan's occupation of China's island territories in the late 1800s and early 1900s.

Japanese cooking techniques were combined with French techniques in 1970s France to create nouvelle cuisine.

Wolfgang Puck is attributed as one of the pioneers of fusion cuisine, with some dispute. However, his restaurant Chinois on Main was named after the term attributed to Richard Wing, who in the 1960s combined French and Chinese cooking at the former Imperial Dynasty restaurant in Hanford, California.

Chef Norman Van Aken was the first person to use the term "fusion cooking" as he delivered a speech at a symposium in Santa Fe in 1988. Soon journalist Regina Schrambling wrote about Van Aken's work and the term spread around the globe. Norman Van Aken ended his speech by discussing the history of fusion cuisine, such as the use of coffee in Italian cuisine. Van Aken related this to coffee being used in different desserts such as Calabrian ricotta with chocolate mousse.

See also

 2010s in food
 American Chinese cuisine
 Tex-Mex
 Korean-Mexican fusion
 Itameshi
 Yōshoku, a style of Western-influenced cooking in Japan, primarily consisting of Japanized forms of European dishes
 Polish-style Asian cuisine,  Based on Vietnamese cuisine and integrate other Asian cuisine and Polish eating habits.
 Betawi cuisine
 California cuisine
 Eurasian cuisine of Singapore and Malaysia
 Modern Australian cuisine
 New American cuisine
 Nouvelle cuisine
 Peranakan cuisine
 Sushi burrito
 Sushi pizza
 Indian Chinese cuisine
 Japanese Chinese cuisine
 Chifa
 Migrants' food consumption

References

External links